Peter Simon Liss CBE FRS (born 27 October 1942) is a British environmental scientist, and professorial fellow, at the University of East Anglia.

Background

Liss studied at Durham University, earning a BSc. He then completed a PhD at the University of Wales.

Career
His research group is a part of the Laboratory for Global Marine and Atmospheric Chemistry (LGMAC).
He is a member of the Solar Radiation Working Group.

He was awarded the Challenger Society Medal in 2000 and the John Jeyes Medal of the Royal Society of Chemistry in 2003/04.

References

External links
https://royalsociety.org/people/peter-liss-11824/
https://web.archive.org/web/20120415140750/http://www.vmine.net/scienceinparliament/9%20Feb%20Marine%20Engineering%20meeting%20notice%20revised270110.pdf
http://www.nio.org/index/option/com_newsdisplay/task/view/tid/4/sid/23/nid/77

1942 births
Living people
Alumni of University College, Durham
Academics of the University of East Anglia
Fellows of the Royal Society
Commanders of the Order of the British Empire
British scientists
Environmental scientists